This is a list of the governors of the province of Wardak, Afghanistan.

Governors of Wardak Province

See also
 List of current governors of Afghanistan

Notes

Wardak